R. Lee Heath served as Chief of Police of the Los Angeles Police Department from August 1, 1924 to March 31, 1926. Heath had joined the L.A.P.D. in 1904 and was reputed to be the most adroit politician in the department, eventually rising to the level of top cop. He was a police captain when he was appointed chief, replacing Chief August Vollmer, the former Police Chief of Berkeley, California who had served as interim chief for exactly one year.

Five new police stations were constructed while Heath was chief. To battle bootleggers and rum-runners during Prohibition, Heath had the L.A.P.D. purchase ten 30.06 Browning Automatic Rifles to enable his police force to counter the gangsters firepower. He declined to purchase .30-caliber Browning machine guns.

Innovations
During his tenure as chief, the Chemical Lab and Photo Lab were created. Both served as forerunners to the L.A.P.D.'s  Scientific Investigation Division. A separate division overseeing police training was first implemented in 1925.

Before he was appointed chief, Heath became intrigued by the possibilities of radio in law enforcement when he attended the Amateur Radio Show in Los Angeles in May 1924. The show featured hand-made radio receivers that could be mounted in an automobile and put to use for police work. At the 1925 National Radio Exposition, Heath demonstrated that an airplane equipped with a radio could follow an automobile and broadcast the vehicle's movements via radio station KRCA.

Controversy
Heath allegedly was a protégé of Kent Kane Parrot, the chief of staff of Los Angeles Mayor George E. Cryer, the assistant district attorney who was elected in 1921 as a reformer. Known as the "De Facto Mayor of Los Angeles", Parrot served as the political boss of Los Angeles. He reputedly was the architect of "The Combination", the alliance between politicians, the police and the underworld, that ran L.A. for decades. Parrot was said to have run the L.A.P.D., making personnel transfers without consulting the Chief. He was closely connected to the king of L.A.'s vice rackets, Charlie Crawford. The Combination became so notorious during the Cryer Administration that it was called "The City Hall Gang".

References

Hays, Thomas G. Hays, Arthur W. Sjoquist, and William J. Bratton. Los Angeles Police Department (Mount Pleasant, SC: Arcadia Publishing, 2005), p. 45. 

Chiefs of the Los Angeles Police Department